Elections to Ellesmere Port and Neston Borough Council were held on 2 May 2002. One third of the council was up for election and the Labour Party stayed in overall control of the council.

After the election, the composition of the council was:
Labour 33
Conservative 8
Liberal Democrat 2

Results

Ward results

References
2002 Ellesmere Port and Neston election result
 Ward results

2002 English local elections
2002
2000s in Cheshire